Dorothy Cronin (9 January 1920 – 2 April 2000), professionally known as Bunney Brooke, was an Australian actress, creator, producer, director, designer, playwright and casting agent, best known for her being one of the early faces of Australian television. Known for her television, movie, theatre acting and comedy roles including the long-running role of Flo Patterson in the soap opera and movie release version of Number 96 in the 1970s (a role for which she won a Silver Logie Award), and in her later years to a new generation of viewers in her role as Helen "Nell" Rickards in children's series Round the Twist (1989 and 1992) and her role as Violet "Vi" Patchett in E Street (1990).

Personal life 
Brooke was born as Dorothy Cronin in Bendigo, Victoria, adopted at an early age and had an unhappy early life. She was raised by foster parents, and then later joined the Australian Army at the age of 18. As a young adult, she saw marriage as a means of escape, marrying Leonard Brooke in 1946. The union produced two children but ended after four years, with Brooke reporting that they were "wrong for marriage".

Brooke switched to the carefree life of a drifter with little money and few possessions. After becoming disillusioned with this existence, Brooke sought conventional employment as a clown, acting teacher, café owner and train conductor. Subsequent experiences of a broken marriage, two children and struggles with depression, illness and lack of money which gave her the depth for years later to win the Best Actress Logie for a 1974 episode of Number 96 as Flo Patterson, jilted at the altar.
In the early 1950s, Brooke managed the Prompt Corner coffee lounge in Melbourne with her girlfriend. At that time, several city coffee lounges implicitly catered specifically to LGBT patrons at a time when few other commercial venues existed for them. Prompt Corner also held poetry readings and, aside from the gay and lesbian patrons, it attracted the theatrical and bohemian crowd.

Brooke landed the front cover of the edition of 28 April 1975 of Brisbane's TV Week Magazine, giving an interview of her "battle to the top" explaining being in a better position in life, career success and being a star in the earlier years of Australian TV. In April 1976 Brooke endured a heart seizure which brought her to the "brink of death" collapsing at her Rozelle home with crushing chest pains then spending 10 days in intensive care of Balmain Hospital, Sydney. It was the fourth time in 5 years suffering a similar seizure. In Brooke's case, the seizure was brought on by a busy change in lifestyle over a period of months, causing extreme tension that affected the heart; doctors warned she must never endure such tension again, and she made sure it did not happen again. In 1976, Brooke moved into her house in the near city suburb of Balmain, yet one year later rented the house and moved out due to a terror campaign which bizarrely included threats, anonymous letters, visits from police, ambulancemen and an undertaker. Brooke owned two dogs, as did her neighbor, and both received photostat pamphlets about keeping residence dogs under control, which is believed to have been the first indication of the aforementioned events.

Brooke lived with Pat McDonald, who suggested her for the role of Flo Patterson. They shared the same birth year and a small house at the eastern end of Fox Valley Road in Wahroonga in northern Sydney. Although the true nature of their relationship was never originally detailed, many photos of them on holiday in various overseas locations were featured in magazines. Pat McDonald would later die in 1990 of pancreas cancer.

Brooke endured a nervous breakdown within the mid-1990s, which was a few years before her death. It is not known as to why, but Brooke did have a history of depression in the earlier decades of her career.

Career

Earlier career (1940s–1970s) 

Brooke later worked as a typist with Melbourne-based television production company Crawford Productions. The association with Crawford awoke Brooke's creative side, and she became interested in scripts, joining an amateur theatrical group. A year later, she traveled to the UK and, within a week of arriving, had secured work in the repertory theatre as well as radio and television shows. Her first Magic Circle Club guest appearance, as a Southern belle with two suitors, led to a recurring role as Aunty Vale (an enchantress) in the children's television series. She later became a mime artist whilst in Europe as studied under Marcel Marceau in Paris. In the late-1940s it is believed one year later Brooke returned to Australia and gained her legal name "Bunney Brooke", which would later become her much well known name.

Brooke's acting career continued into the 1970s. She was working as director of the Adelaide Theatre Company when she was asked to audition for a role in Number 96. The producers of the show were having trouble filling the role of Flo, a friend and comic foil of gossip Dorrie Evans (Pat McDonald), and Brooke fit the part. Initially seen as a frequent visitor to the flat of Dorrie and her husband Herb, the writers soon burnt down Flo's off-screen apartment in a neighboring suburb and moved Flo permanently into Dorrie and Herb's flat, where she became a key character in many of the serial's comedy stories.

Brooke continued with Number 96 until the series ended in 1977, also appearing in the film adaptation in 1974. After this she remained a frequent face on Australian television, with roles in television programs like the soap operas The Young Doctors and The Restless Years in the late 1970s. Brooke was specially written into the Young Doctors episode as a clown, she so impressed Grundy Organization executive Reg Watson with her knowledge of clownsmanship. Ten years prior, she wrote a play about a clown in a bid to entice the very young into theatrical appreciation about a clown who had a skip acting parlance from a clothes basket. So successful was the play she did another naming her clown Trumbo and had him looking for his red nose. Finding such enthusiastic responses from audiences in small theater venues around Melbourne, Brooke then wrote a third clown play. She also played various roles in films, miniseries, and TV movies. She acted in the feature film Dawn!, about Olympic Swimmer Dawn Fraser, playing the role of Fraser's mother.

Later career (1980s–1990s) 

By the early 1980s, in senior years, Brooke was living in Melbourne and again working for Crawford Productions, this time as a casting agent. She also had acting roles in the Crawford shows Skyways and Carson's Law. In the 1980s, she cast a relatively unknown Kylie Minogue for The Henderson Kids. In November 1980, Brooke won the Penguin Award of "BEST SINGLE PERFORMANCE BY AN ACTRESS" – Rock Pool, ABC

Next Brooke was known to a new generation of viewers with an ongoing role in the children's series Round the Twist (1989) as Nell Rickards, and, in 1990, acted at the same time as the ongoing role of Auntie Violet "Vi" Patchett in the soap opera E Street. When she left that series in 1991, her character was written out by accepting the marriage proposal of old friend Johnny Little, played by former Number 96 actor Johnny Lockwood in a guest role. She later appeared in the second series of Round the Twist (1992) and guest starred in some of the later episodes of A Country Practice. Brooke, alongside previous co-star Joyce Jacobs from A Country Practice, acted in a short called Heaven on the 4th Floor (1998), credited as "Bunny Brooke". (Note that is with the letter "e" missing from the first name as sometimes credited in other various previous works.) This would be her last known acting credit; she was subsequently diagnosed with cancer, and her eventual death followed in 2000.

Brooke is known to have at least 69 known acting credits to her name in theater work, spanning four decades ranging from 1959 to 1989. However, Brooke's esteemed acting career actually spanned a total of fifty years.

Death 
Brooke, a heavy smoker and drinker, died in a Manly, New South Wales, hospital on 2 April 2000 at the age of 80, after a two-year battle with bowel and liver cancer.

On 20 January 2009, her 1974 Silver Logie Award (presented to Brooke in 1975 by the late Hollywood great John Wayne) was purchased by an anonymous Queensland bidder in a 24-hour auction on eBay for AU$2225. Given that Brooke died in 2000, it is not entirely known how the award then came to be in the possession of the seller.

Tributes
Charlie Little, director, had Brooke reflect on her life to him not long before she died as her illness worsened. Little recalls, she said "I've done all the things I've wanted to do in my life. I've been a very lucky woman". He also said Brooke was "Quite Chaplin-esque".

Elisabeth Kirkby, fellow Number 96 cast-member and former NSW Politician, said: "Brooke's performance was mesmerising. There was no dialogue. It was just the expression on her face. It was almost as [if] it was actually happening".

Elaine Lee, another Number 96 cast-member, said Brooke "was about laughter, laughter, laughter. We used to laugh a lot, she was a very funny lady".
Mark Mitchell, comedian and fellow Round The Twist star, said it was "impossible not to learn from Bunney. You could turn to her in a moment of exasperation knowing she would impart something very timely, if humbling".

Frankie J. Holden, another Round The Twist star, said Brooke "Could play with the kids, be a serious actress opposite the adults and that night drink the crew under the table".

Joanna Milosz (also known as Joanna Milosz-Piekarska), Brooke's long-time agent, said: "Nearly everyone in the industry of the older generation knew Brooke, worked with Brooke, was taught by Brooke or directed by Brooke" and "she had an incredible impact on the industry".

Filmography

Film

Television

Awards

References

External links 
 
 

1920 births
2000 deaths
20th-century Australian actresses
Australian soap opera actresses
Australian stage actresses
Australian theatre directors
Australian casting directors
Women casting directors
Deaths from cancer in New South Wales
Australian lesbian actresses
Logie Award winners
People from Bendigo
20th-century Australian LGBT people